Gonçalo Nicau (born 3 July 1982) is a Portuguese former professional tennis player who competed in the ITF Men's Circuit. He achieved his highest singles ranking of 531 in the world by the Association of Tennis Professionals (ATP) in February 2007. Though he did not enter a singles event in the ATP Challenger Tour, Nicau did play in the doubles event at the 2006 Estoril Open and was selected for two Davis Cup ties in 2006.

Career

Junior years
Nicau had a brief junior career. He made his main draw debut in August 1998 at the Grade 5 Junior Tennis Cup in Vila do Conde. His other main draw appearance was at the same event the following year. He attained the Under-16 Portuguese No.1 position and was Under-18 runner-up at the Portuguese National Championships in 1999. That same year, he joined Clube de Ténis de Faro, where he remained until 2003.

Professional circuit
After a qualifying attempt in 1997, Nicau turned professional with a main draw debut in the ITF Men's Circuit in November 2001 at the Albufeira Satellite tournament. His first win came in 2004 at another Satellite event in Coimbra, where he reached the quarterfinals. In 2003 Nicau and Israel Monteiro lost to Leonardo Tavares and Tiago Godinho in the final of the men's doubles event at the Portuguese National Championships.

In February 2006, Nicau joined the Portugal Davis Cup team for the first time, but lost the singles match to Gilles Kremer of Luxembourg. In March, Nicau played his first professional final at a Futures event in Benin City and captured his first title at a Futures doubles event in Albufeira. In May, he partnered with Frederico Gil, constituting his only appearance at the main draw of an ATP Tour event. At the 2006 Estoril Open doubles event, he and Gil were defeated in the first round by the second seeds and eventual champions Lukáš Dlouhý and Pavel Vízner.

After winning Futures singles and doubles events in Spain in August, Nicau was called up for the Portugal Davis Cup team for the second and final time in September. Against Morocco, he lost the singles match to Rabie Chaki after 4 hours and 30 minutes of playit was the longest match ever for Portugal in the competition until 2010. Nicau and Gil won the doubles match, and Portugal won the tie. Nicau ended 2006 with a runner-up performance at the Portuguese National Championships.

Nicau began the 2007 season with early round losses at Futures events in March. In June, Nicau partnered with Rui Machado to win a doubles Futures event in Málaga, which turned out to be his last professional tournament.

Post-retirement
Shortly after retiring, Nicau started coaching Rui Machado. Under his guidance, Machado entered his first Grand Slam main draw event at the 2008 US Open, won his first ATP Challenger titles in 2009, and broke through to the top 100 in October 2010. The partnership ended in December 2010. Nicau remained coaching at the Clube Escola de Ténis in Oeiraswhere he had joined as a player in 2006. He worked under the supervision of João Cunha e Silva.

Nicau decided to join padel tennis in 2014. Alongside João Roque, Nicau became men doubles national champion in 2014 and 2015.

Career finals

ITF Men's Circuit

Singles: 2 (1 title, 1 runner-up)

Doubles: 5 (3 titles, 2 runners-up)

National participation

Davis Cup (1 win, 2 losses)
Nicau played 3 matches in 2 ties for the Portugal Davis Cup team in 2006. His singles record was 0–2 and his doubles record was 1–0 (1–2 overall).

   indicates the result of the Davis Cup match followed by the score, date, place of event, the zonal classification and its phase, and the court surface.

See also

Portugal Davis Cup team

References

External links

1982 births
Living people
Portuguese male tennis players
People from Portalegre, Portugal
Sportspeople from Portalegre District
21st-century Portuguese people